Vusumuzi Cyril Xaba (born 1967) is a South African politician and a Member of the National Assembly of South Africa since 2019. He is currently serving as Co-Chairperson of the Joint Standing Committee on Defence and as Chairperson of the  Portfolio Committee on Defence and Military Veterans. A member of the African National Congress, he previously served in the KwaZulu-Natal Legislature from 1994 to 2009 and from 2014 to 2019. He was the   Member of the Executive Council (MEC) for the KwaZulu-Natal Department of Agriculture and Rural Development from 2014 to 2016.

Early life and education
Xaba was born in 1967. He attended Ziphathele High School. He holds a B.Proc from the University of Natal and a Master of Laws (LLM) from the University of KwaZulu-Natal. He has a number of incomplete degrees. In 1987, he enrolled for a BA in Law at the University of Durban-Westville. He could not complete the degree due to political reasons. Xaba later studied for a diploma in economic principles from the University of London, but he did not complete the course. His studies for a Bachelor of Laws (LLB) at the University of Natal was discontinued because of his election as a Member of the Provincial Legislature.

Political career
In 1985, he became a member of the Clermont Branch Executive of the Congress of South African Students (COSAS). Xaba was a member of the  Provincial Executive Committee of the Natal Students Congress (NASCO) between 1986 and 1987. From 1989 to 1990, he served as deputy president of the Black Students Society (BSS) at the University of Natal.

Xaba served as the deputy regional chair and later as the chairperson of the ANC Youth League's Southern Natal region from 1990 to 1993. He was an ex officio member of the National Executive Committee (NEC) of the ANC Youth League between 1991 and 1993. Xaba was an ex officio member of the ANC's Regional Executive Committee from 1991 to 1993, before serving as an ordinary member of the regional executive committee between 1993 and 1994. In 1995, Xaba was elected as the regional secretary of the ANC's Durban West region, a position he held until 2001. Between 2002 and 2007, Xaba was the deputy chairperson of the ANC's eThekwini Region. Xaba was an ex officio member of the ANC's provincial executive committee from 1995 to 2001 and from 2004 to 2012, he served as an ordinary member.

KwaZulu-Natal Legislature
In 1994 Xaba was elected as a member of the KwaZulu-Natal Legislature for the ANC. From 1994 to 1999, he was the ANC's spokesperson on education. From 1999 to 2009, he was chairperson of the public works portfolio committee, the finance portfolio committee, the finance and economic development portfolio committee and an ad-hoc constitutional affairs committee to draft a provincial constitution for KwaZulu-Natal. He was also chief whip and a member of a number of committees. Xaba left the legislature in 2009 to become a special adviser to the Premier of KwaZulu-Natal. From 2010 to 2014, Xaba was chairperson of the KwaZulu-Natal Provincial Planning Commission.

After the 2014 provincial election, Xaba was elected to return to the provincial legislature and was appointed as MEC for Agriculture and Rural Development. He was removed from the executive council in 2016.

National parliament
In 2019 Xaba was elected from the ANC's KwaZulu-Natal list. On 2 July 2019, he was elected chairperson of the Portfolio Committee on Defence and Military Veterans. Xaba was elected co-chairperson of the  Joint Standing Committee on Defence on 25 July 2019.

References

External links

Mr Vusumuzi Cyril Xaba at Parliament of South Africa

Living people
1967 births
Zulu people
People from KwaZulu-Natal
21st-century South African politicians
African National Congress politicians
Members of the National Assembly of South Africa
Members of the KwaZulu-Natal Legislature
University of Natal alumni
University of KwaZulu-Natal alumni